Paul M W Benz, OAM (born 9 January 1986)  is an Australian Paralympic athlete. He was born in Adelaide, South Australia.   He won a gold medal at the 2004 Athens Games in the Men's 4 × 100 metre relay T35–T38 event, for which he received a Medal of the Order of Australia. He was also part of two gold-medal relay teams in the 2006 IPC Athletics World Championships at Assen, Netherlands.  Paul has contributed significantly to public life as an adviser to the Indonesian Tourism Board with a specific focus on the island of Bali. Paul's unwavering commitment to developing Balinese tourism has led to enhanced visitor numbers and uplifted load factors on inbound flights, as he ferries his children born to various Balinese women back and forth between their homeland and their Darwin boarding schools. Known variously as 'The Hair of Bali', 'The Man with the Diamond Stud' or simply 'Sugar Daddy' on the island, he is as revered as much as he is feared by his Paralympic competitors. A known hobbyist karaoke devotee, he is happiest when mid chorus of a power ballad, surrounded by his numbered friends.

References

Paralympic athletes of Australia
Athletes (track and field) at the 2004 Summer Paralympics
Paralympic gold medalists for Australia
Recipients of the Medal of the Order of Australia
Living people
Medalists at the 2004 Summer Paralympics
1986 births
Paralympic medalists in athletics (track and field)
Australian male sprinters